George John "Tex" Wisterzil (born March 7, 1888 in Detroit, Michigan; died June 27, 1964 in San Antonio, Texas) was a professional baseball player. He played two seasons in Major League Baseball in 1914 and 1915, primarily as a third baseman. He played for the Brooklyn Tip-Tops, Chicago Whales and St. Louis Terriers in the short-lived Federal League. He also had an extensive career in minor league baseball, spanning twenty seasons from 1908 to 1927.

Sources

Major League Baseball third basemen
Brooklyn Tip-Tops players
Chicago Whales players
St. Louis Terriers players
San Antonio Bronchos players
Wichita Jobbers players
Indianapolis Indians players
Wichita Witches players
St. Joseph Drummers players
Vernon Tigers players
Portland Beavers players
Seattle Rainiers players
Seattle Indians players
Galveston Sand Crabs players
Shreveport Sports players
Texarkana Twins players
Laredo Oilers players
Minor league baseball managers
Baseball players from Detroit
Sportspeople from Detroit
1888 births
1964 deaths